Clepsis bertiogana is a species of moth of the family Tortricidae. It is found in São Paulo, Brazil.

The wingspan is about 11 mm. The ground colour of the forewings is brownish cream, sprinkled with brown and with brown markings with some darker strips. The hindwings are pale brownish grey, but paler basally.

Etymology
The species name refers to the type locality, Bertioga, Brazil.

References

Moths described in 2010
Clepsis